Barbie in the 12 Dancing Princesses is a 2006 computer-animated dance film. It first premiered on Nickelodeon on September 10, 2006, and it was later released to DVD on September 19.

The film was directed by Greg Richardson and loosely based on the German fairy tale "The Twelve Dancing Princesses". It is the ninth entry in the Barbie film series and features the voice of Kelly Sheridan as the Barbie protagonist. This is the first Barbie film to be distributed by Universal Studios Home Entertainment in North America, to-which Universal's international subsidiary already handled distribution to the previous films under a deal with Entertainment Rights.

Music for the film was composed by Arnie Roth. "Shine", the end title song written by Roth, Amy Powers and Rob Hudnut, was nominated for a 2007 Emmy Award.

Plot
Genevieve (played by Barbie) is one of twelve princesses who share a passion for dancing and live in a castle with their widowed father, King Randolph. Unbeknownst to the princesses, other people consider them improper for having unique but unladylike hobbies and interests. King Randolph summons his cousin, Duchess Rowena, to help educate them into proper ladies. However, the Duchess wants the throne and removes all color, music, and joy from the palace, trying to break the girls' spirits.

On their youngest sisters' birthday, the other sisters gift a copy of their late mother's favorite story, wherein a princess discovers a magical land and dances there for three nights before it vanishes. Looking at the story and the tiles on their bedroom floor, Genevieve discovers how to open a portal into the magical land. Upon entering, they dance the night away. They learn the hanging golden flowers grant wishes, the statues can come to life, and the water has healing properties.

The next day, the princesses appear tired and Rowena finds their new dancing shoes worn out, arousing her suspicions. King Randolph falls ill, so Genevieve asks the royal cobbler, Derek (played by Ken), to investigate Rowena's true intentions. That night, the princesses return to the magical land; Derek confronts a local apothecary and deduces that Rowena has been poisoning the King.

The next morning, the sisters are again exhausted. Rowena, refusing to believe the sisters when they tell her the truth, forces them into servitude. After overhearing Rowena maneuver the King into referring to his daughters as burdens, the heartbroken princesses return to the magical land for a third time, and Rowena finds them missing the next morning.

Derek figures out how to open the portal. Rowena's pet monkey, Brutus, spies on Derek and leads Rowena through after him; she steals one of the wish-granting flowers. The princesses decide to go home and help their father; however, Rowena returns to the palace ahead of them and has her henchman, Desmond, destroy the portal. Derek and Genevieve figure out how to activate another portal by dancing together, freeing the group.

Once home, they find out that the King is dying and that Rowena has taken over as Queen. The Duchess uses the golden flower to wish for Genevieve to dance forever without rest, but Genevieve blows the magic dust back at her with a hand fan, forcing Rowena to dance uncontrollably. When Desmond tries to help Rowena, he is pulled into the spell, and the two dance their way out of the castle. Lacey uses the healing water she took from the magic land to revive her father. King Randolph affirms his unconditional love for his daughters and Genevieve and Derek celebrate their wedding.

Characters

Princesses
Each of the 12 Princesses is designated with a gemstone and a flower. Each princess' flower appears on their dresses, the book gifted to each of them, and on the stones on the floor of their bedroom, and each of the princesses' names begin with the first 12 letters of the alphabet.

Ashlyn is the 22-year-old eldest sister. She is practical, calm and knowledgeable. She loves music, especially playing the flute and oboe. She is straightforward and cares for her sisters, for whom she tries to act as a role model. Her flower is the purple geranium and her gemstone is a garnet. She bears the most resemblance to her mother Queen Isabella, and wears a purple dress.
 Blair is the 21-year-old 2nd sister. She loves horseback riding and collects music boxes. Feisty and outspoken, Blair is always the first to voice her opinion, especially her complaints about Rowena's presence in their lives. Her flower is larkspur and her gemstone is a ruby. She wears a red dress.
 Courtney is the 20-year-old 3rd sister and is close to Ashlyn and Blair. She seems to be the shyest of the twelve sisters. Her favorite hobby is reading, which makes her intelligent and open-minded, but often renders her totally oblivious to her surroundings. Her flower is the forget-me-not and her gemstone is a sapphire. She wears a blue dress.
 Delia is the adventurous 19-year-old 4th sister and Edeline's fraternal twin. She loves sports, especially croquet and horseback riding. Her flower is the sunflower and her gemstone is a green peridot. She wears a green dress.
 Edeline is the 19-year-old 5th sister and Delia's fraternal twin. She loves to play sports, her favorites being badminton and croquet. She also tends to be messy and disorganized. Her flower is honeysuckle and her gemstone is orange citrine. She wears an orange dress.
 Fallon is the 17-year-old 6th sister. She loves animals, plays the harp, and is a romantic who hopes everyone can find their happily ever after. She likes hearts, lace, and writing stories. Her flower is the camellia and her gemstone is a pearl. She wears a pink dress.
 Barbie as Genevieve is the 16-year-old 7th sister, and the main protagonist of the film. She tends to run late for all sorts of occasions. She is also an experienced chess player. Next to her family, Genevieve loves dancing more than anything. Derek, the royal cobbler, harbors romantic feelings for her. Her flower is the pink rose and her gemstone is a pink opal. She wears a dark pink and white dress. 
 Skipper as Hadley is the 12-year-old 8th sister and Isla's fraternal twin. She loves to walk on stilts, an interest she shares with Isla. Her flower is the narcissus and her gemstone is a topaz. She wears a turquoise dress.
 Isla is the 12-year-old 9th sister and Hadley's fraternal twin. Isla is a skilled acrobat and enjoys walking on stilts with her twin. Her flower is the lily of the valley and her gemstone is an emerald. She wears a light violet dress.
 Chelsie as Janessa is the 5-year-old 10th sister and leader of the young fraternal triplets. She is interested in bugs and loves collecting them. While she may be bossy at times, her intentions are always good. Her flower is the jonquil and her gemstone is aquamarine. She wears a light blue dress.
 Kathleen is the 5-year-old 11th sister, the middle triplet, and is close with both triplets. She loves art and enjoys painting, but tends to be messy like her big sister, Edeline. Kathleen is down-to-earth and helps keep balance among the triplets. Her flower is the daisy and her gemstone is a pink diamond. She wears a light pink and yellow dress.
 Kelly as Lacey is the 5-year-old youngest sister. She is very close to her big sister, Genevieve and likes to collect teddy bears. Being the youngest, she is timid, somewhat clumsy and frequently needs help for the simplest things. Even though she loves her sisters and her father, Lacey often wonders about where she belongs in her large family. Her flower is the white lily and her gemstone is an amethyst. She wears a light purple dress.

Other
 Ken as Derek is a handsome, 16 year old royal cobbler. He is friends with Genevieve and her sisters, secretly in love with Genevieve, and becomes the princesses' main ally in stopping Rowena. At the end of the film, he and Genevieve are happily wedded.
 Felix is Derek's talking parrot. He wants Derek and Genevieve to be together, often blabbing hints about how Derek feels to Genevieve, which causes great embarrassment for his master.
 Duchess Rowena is King Randolph's cousin and the primary antagonist of the film. She is brought to the castle to help the king raise his twelve daughters. She seeks to steal the throne by poisoning Randolph and getting rid of the twelve princesses. She is doomed to dance forever when a spell she tried to use on Genevieve backfires.
 King Randolph is the father of the twelve dancing princesses. He loves his daughters more than anything, but is determined to turn them into "proper princesses" with Rowena. Little does he know Rowena is slowly poisoning him in an attempt to steal his throne and that it is up to his "unruly" daughters to save him.
 Desmond is Rowena's large and ruthless footman. He seems to have a crush on Rowena, doing anything she says to please her. He is doomed to dance with her forever when he tries to free the cursed duchess.
 Twyla is Genevieve's pet kitten. She tries to act tough in front of her enemies and is constantly fighting with Rowena's monkey, Brutus. She is friends with Felix and believes that she is related to the tigers of India.
 Brutus is Rowena's pet monkey, who is just as cruel and arrogant as his mistress. He loves making Twyla angry and often spies on the princesses to find ways to get them in trouble with Rowena.
 Mr. Fabian is an apothecary who sells poison to Rowena in exchange for stolen goods. He is eventually tracked down by Derek, who trades his horse for Queen Isabella's goblet.
 Queen Isabella is the late mother of the twelve princesses. She is seen in the movie through a portrait that hangs near the entrance of the castle. Even in death, she helps her daughters discover the magical kingdom and the importance of family. Her goblet is stolen by Rowena to purchase poison from the apothecary.

Voice cast

Production
The film's ballet scenes feature the movement of New York City Ballet dancers, computer animated through motion capture imaging.

Music
The songs featured in this film are:
 12 Dancing Princesses theme song, based on the theme from the Siciliana in Respighi's Ancient Airs and Dances.
 Shine (End credit song), performed by Cassidy Ladden
 The Birthday Song (Sang for the Triplets, until Rowena stopped it)
 Argeers by John Playford (When Derek plays a tune for them)
 Sacerdotes Domini by William Byrd (Sang by the princesses on their father's bedroom when he got ill)
 Mendelssohn's Midsummer Night's Dream – Nocturne (When they first step in the magical world and ride the boat) 
 Mendelssohn's Midsummer Night's Dream – Fairies' March (When the triplets fall asleep and the other girls dance)
 Felix Mendelssohn's Fourth Symphony, the third and first movement (Played when the princesses are dancing on the first and second night respectively)
 Mendelssohn's Fourth Symphony, second movement (played when Rowena accuses the girls of lying and place them in servitude)
 Mendelssohn's Fifth Symphony, second movement (played when the girls dance with the brass statues)
 Mendelssohn's Fourth Symphony's last movement is played at the final confrontation of Rowena and Desmond by the princesses and Derek.
 Gottschalk – Tarantella for piano and orchestra is played when Rowena and Desmond dance at the end.

Reception

Commercial reception
In the October 14, 2006 issue of Billboard, Barbie in the 12 Dancing Princesses debuted at number one on the Top DVD Sales chart. The film sold nearly 500,000 units in its first week, 15% more than the previous princess-themed film in the Barbie franchise.

Critical response
Jill Stark of The Sunday Age rated the film 3/5 stars, calling it "good wholesome stuff, though the story sometimes plods." Describing the plot as "Footloose in a fairy-tale setting", D. Liebenson of The Video Librarian wrote, "Barbie in the 12 Dancing Princesses serves up plenty of magic to enchant young, starry-eyed Barbie fans and aspiring dancers", and "the CGI animation sparkles, with each character boasting an otherworldly porcelain sheen."

Reviewing the film for Common Sense Media, Teresa Talerico described it as "an innocent story about sisterly love and ballet dancing" but advised that the villain subplot and poisoning scenes may be frightening for young children. Talerico also wrote that the 12 sisters' characters weren't well developed.

Awards
Daytime Emmy Award for Original Song in a Children's, Young Adult or Animated Program — Nominated ("Shine" by Arnie Roth, composer; Amy Powers, lyricist; Robert Hudnut, lyricist)
Leo Award for Best Animation Program or Series — Nominated (Jeysca Durchin Schnepp, Jennifer Twiner McCarron, Shea Wageman – Producers) 
Leo Award for Best Direction/Storyboarding in an Animation Program or Series — Nominated (Greg Richardson)

Merchandise
The line of tie-in Barbie in the 12 Dancing Princesses products included dolls, playsets and accessories. Dolls of each of the 12 princess characters and Derek were released, as well as a "Magic Dance Castle" dollhouse, a princess vanity for the 12 dolls, a horse and carriage set that can seat all 12 dolls, and two Twyla plush toys.

References

External links
 Barbie in the 12 Dancing Princesses are the Universal Pictures Home Entertainment portal
 
 
 

2006 direct-to-video films
Barbie films
2006 computer-animated films
Films set in the 1810s
Films set in the 21st century
2000s English-language films
2000s fantasy adventure films
Universal Pictures direct-to-video films
2000s dance films
Universal Pictures direct-to-video animated films
2000s American animated films
American direct-to-video films
American children's animated adventure films
American children's animated fantasy films
American fantasy adventure films
Canadian direct-to-video films
Canadian animated fantasy films
Canadian independent films
Canadian children's animated films
Films based on Grimms' Fairy Tales
Films set in Germany
2000s children's animated films
2000s children's fantasy films
2006 films
Animated films about sisters
2000s Canadian films